Ryazanovo is a rural locality (a settlement) in Vinogradovsky District, Arkhangelsk Oblast, Russia. The population was 333 as of 2010. There is 1 street.

Geography 
Ryazanovo is located on the Severnaya Dvina River, 31 km northwest of Bereznik (the district's administrative centre) by road. Khetovo is the nearest rural locality.

References 

Rural localities in Vinogradovsky District